The European Masters Games (EMG) is a multi-sport event, consisting of summer sports, that is held every four years.  The European Masters Games are owned by the International Masters Games Association (IMGA), who also own the World Masters Games. The age categories vary depending on the sport but the competition is generally for people 30–35 years or older. The first games were held in 2008 in Malmö, Sweden. The European Masters Games are held once every four year, while the last games were held in 2015 in Nice, France, the next games will be celebrated in Turin, Italy, in 2019.  The International Masters Games Association (IMGA), which is based in Lausanne, Switzerland, is the body responsible for the bidding and placing of the games.

History 
The first European Masters Games (EMG) was held from August 29 to September 7, 2008, in Malmö, Sweden.
There was a total of 3,022 athletes who competed in 18 sports during the 10 days the games were held.

Editions

Summer sports

See also 
World Masters Games
Asia Pacific Masters Games
Americas Masters Games

References

External links 
 International Masters Games Association Homepage
 EMG 2008 Blog
 EMG 2015 – Ville de Nice
 Masters Events website
 Video Summary EMG NICE 2015
 2008 website
 2011 website
 2015 website
 2019 website 

Masters Games
Multi-sport events in Europe
Senior sports competitions